God is Great may refer to:

The Takbir, the Arabic phrase "Allāhu Akbar", often translated as "God is Great"
God Is Great and I'm Not (Dieu est grand, je suis toute petite), a 2001 French film
God is Great (no. 2), a 1991 sculpture by John Latham

See also
God Is Not Great, a 2007 book by Christopher Hitchens
God Is Good (disambiguation)